Pailan is a village within the jurisdiction of the Bishnupur police station in the Bishnupur I CD block in the Alipore Sadar subdivision of the South 24 Parganas district in the Indian state of West Bengal.

Geography

Transport
Pailan is on the National Highway 12.

Majerhat railway station is located nearby.

Education
Pailan College of Management and Technology, established in 2003, offers diploma, undergraduate and postgraduate degree courses in Engineering and Technology and other allied fields.

Pailan World School is an English-medium coeducational institution established in 2005. It has facilities for teaching from class I to class XII.

Healthcare
Chandi Doulatabad Block Primary Health Centre, with 10 beds, at Doulatabad (PO Nepalganj), is the major government medical facility in the Bishnupur I CD block.

References

Villages in South 24 Parganas district